Burstein is a surname. Notable people with the surname include:

Albert Burstein (born 1922), American Democratic Party politician in the New Jersey General Assembly
Danny Burstein (born 1964), American actor of stage and screen who made his Broadway debut in 1992
Elias Burstein (born 1917), American experimental condensed matter physicist
John Burstein, creator and performer of the fictional character Slim Goodbody, the "Superhero of Health"
Karen Burstein (born 1942), politician and former judge from New York
Keith Burstein (born 1957), English composer, conductor and music theorist with Russian family origins
Mark Burstein, U.S. academic administrator, 16th president of Lawrence University
Michael A. Burstein (born 1970), American writer of science fiction
Nanette Burstein (born 1970), American film and television director
Pesach Burstein (1896–1986), Polish-born American comedian, singer, coupletist, and director of Yiddish vaudeville/theater
Pinchas Burstein (1927–1977), Polish-born Jewish expressionist painter later known as Maryan S. Maryan
Sylvain Burstein (1932–unknown), French chess master
Tal Burstein (born 1980), retired Israeli professional basketball player

See also
Burstein–Moss effect, whereby the apparent band gap of a semiconductor is increased as the absorption edge is pushed to higher energies as a result of all states close to the conduction band being populated
Burgistein
Burgstein
Bustin
Stein (disambiguation)